Noak may refer to:

Noak Bridge, settlement near Basildon, Essex, England
Noak Hill, village in the London Borough of Havering
Gubben Noak, traditional Swedish song, drinking song and bible travesty
NOAK, an acronym for Nth of a kind, as opposed to FOAK, first of a kind

People with the surname
Jürgen Noak, East German slalom canoeist who competed in the 1960s
Karl-Heinz Noak (1916–1978), highly decorated Major in the Wehrmacht during World War II

See also
Noack
Notak
Novak